The year 1777 in science and technology involved some significant events.

Exploration
 March – Third voyage of James Cook: English explorer Captain Cook discovers Mangaia and Atiu in the Cook Islands.

Mathematics
 Leonhard Euler introduces the symbol i to represent the square root of −1.

Technology
 probable date – Thomas Arnold of London produces the first watch ("Arnold 36") to be called a chronometer.

Awards
 Copley Medal: John Mudge

Births
 February 12 – Bernard Courtois, French chemist (died 1838)
 April 30 – Carl Friedrich Gauss, German mathematician (died 1855)
 May 4 – Louis Jacques Thénard, French chemist (died 1857)
 May 18 – John George Children, English chemist, mineralogist and entomologist (died 1852)
 August 14 – Hans Christian Ørsted, Danish physicist (died 1851)

Deaths
 September 22 – John Bartram, naturalist and explorer considered the "father of American botany" (born 1699)
 September 25 – Johann Heinrich Lambert, Swiss polymath (born 1728)
 December 7 – Albrecht von Haller, Swiss anatomist and physiologist (born 1708)
 Celia Grillo Borromeo, Italian scientist and mathematician (born 1684)

References

 
18th century in science
1770s in science